Quercus baloot, the holm oak or holly oak is a rare species of oak that was described by Griffith in 1848. It is classified in subgenus Cerris and section Ilex.

Description

Distribution
it is found in Afghanistan, Pakistan and India (Jammu and Kashmir, Himachal Pradesh).

References

Further reading
Quercus baloot Griff., Itin. Not. 328. 1848

baloot
Plants described in 1848
Taxa named by Edward Griffith (zoologist)